Heiteren is a commune in the Haut-Rhin department in Grand Est in north-eastern France.

The Song "Ballade von Heiteren" performed by Walter Mossmann is dedicated to the resistance against the construction of the Fessenheim Nuclear Power Plant in the 1970s. It describes the organisation of the protests in a roundhouse near Heiteren and the violent repression against the protesters, e.g. by burning down the roundhouse.

See also
 Communes of the Haut-Rhin département

References

Communes of Haut-Rhin